Norman Baker (24 April 1917 – 28 January 1979) was an Australian rules footballer who played with Essendon in the Victorian Football League (VFL).

His football career ended when he enlisted to serve in World War II.

Notes

External links 

Norm Baker's profile at Australianfootball.com

1917 births
1979 deaths
Australian rules footballers from Victoria (Australia)
Essendon Football Club players
Royal Australian Air Force personnel of World War II
Royal Australian Air Force airmen